Killynan (Cooke) is a townland in County Westmeath, Ireland.

Killynan (Cooke) is one of 34 townlands of the civil parish of Rathconnell in the barony of Moyashel and Magheradernon in the Province of Leinster. 

The neighbouring townlands are: Balreagh to the north, Killynan (Pratt) to the east, Aghadaugh to the south–east, Clonickilvant to the south, Cooksborough and Cloghanumera to the south–west, Mountrobert and Loughagar More to the west and Clonkill to the north–west. The N52 road passes through the townland roughly in an east–west direction.

In the 1911 census of Ireland there were 13 houses and 44 inhabitants in the townland.

References

External links
Map of Killynan (Cooke) at openstreetmap.org
Killynan (Cooke) at the IreAtlas Townland Data Base
Killynan (Cooke) at Townlands.ie
Killynan (Cooke) at The Placenames Database of Ireland, Department of Arts, Heritage and the Gaeltacht

Townlands of County Westmeath